The year 1605 in science and technology involved some significant events.

Exploration
 Habitation at Port-Royal established by France under Pierre Dugua, Sieur de Mons, the first European colonization of Nova Scotia in North America (at this time part of Acadia); the Gregorian calendar is adopted.

Chemistry
 First recorded use of the word Chemistry ("Chymistrie") in English, in Thomas Tymme's The Practice of Chymicall and Hermeticall Physicke, translated from Joseph Duchesne.
 The phenomenon of mechanoluminescence is first discovered by Sir Francis Bacon from scratching sugar with a knife.
 Michal Sedziwój publishes the alchemical treatise A New Light of Alchemy which proposes the existence of the "food of life" within air, much later recognized as oxygen.

Technology
 Chartreuse is invented, a liqueur still made by Carthusian monks, named for the great charterhouse (la grande Chartreuse).

Births
 October 19 – Thomas Browne, English physician and encyclopedist (died 1682)
 Martin van den Hove, Dutch astronomer (died 1639)
 approx. date – Semyon Dezhnyov, Pomor navigator (died 1672)

Deaths
 May 4 – Ulisse Aldrovandi, Bolognese naturalist (born 1522)
 December 29 – John Davis, English explorer (born 1550)
 Roger Marbeck, English royal physician (born 1536)

References

 
17th century in science
1600s in science